The 2014–15 Zorya Luhansk season is Zorya's sixteenth Ukrainian Premier League season, and their sixth season under manager Yuriy Vernydub. During the season Zorya Luhansk will compete in the Ukrainian Premier League, Ukrainian Cup and in the UEFA Europa League.

Transfers

In

Summer

Winter

Out

Summer

Winter

Squad 
Squad is given according to the club's official site, and composed from players who playing in the main squad team as of 25 February 2016.

Out on loan

Competitions

Premier League

League table

Results summary

Results by round

Matches

Ukrainian Cup

Qualifying round

Round of 32

Round of 16

Quarter finals

Semi-finals

Final

UEFA Europa League

Qualifying round

Third qualifying round

Play-off round

References

External links 
 Official website
  zarya.lg.ua – Information site of fans of FC Zarya Lugansk
  Unofficial website

Zorya Luhansk
FC Zorya Luhansk seasons
Zorya Luhansk